The 1922 Wolverhampton West by-election was a by-election held for the British House of Commons constituency of Wolverhampton West in Wolverhampton on 7 March 1922.  It was won by the Coalition Conservative candidate Sir Robert Bird.

Vacancy 
The seat had become vacant on when the sitting Conservative Member of Parliament (MP), Sir Alfred Bird had died at the age of 72 on 7 February 1922. He had held the seat since the January 1910 general election.

Candidates 
The Conservative candidate was 45-year-old Sir Robert Bird, son of Sir Alfred. The Labour Party candidate was 49-year-old Alexander Walkden, who had contested the seat in 1918.

The Liberal Party, did not field a candidate at the last general election and decided not to do so again for the by-election. George Thorne, the Liberal MP for Wolverhampton East supported the Labour Party candidate.

Result 
On an increased turnout, the result was a victory for the Coalition Conservative candidate, Sir Robert Bird, although his majority was somewhat reduced from that won by his father in 1918. He held the seat until 1929, regained it in 1931, and stepped down at the 1945 general election.

Walkden stood again (unsuccessfully) at the November 1922 general election, and after contesting Heywood and Radcliffe in 1924, was elected as MP for Bristol South in 1929.

Votes

See also
Wolverhampton West (UK Parliament constituency)
Wolverhampton
Lists of United Kingdom by-elections

References

Sources 

By-elections to the Parliament of the United Kingdom in Staffordshire constituencies
1922 in England
1922 elections in the United Kingdom
Elections in Wolverhampton
By-elections to the Parliament of the United Kingdom in West Midlands (county) constituencies
20th century in Staffordshire